The International Committee on the Rights of Sex Workers in Europe (ICRSE), originally formed as the International Committee for Prostitutes' Rights (ICPR) in 1985, is a sex worker-led network for sex workers' rights, representing more than 100 organisations led by or working with sex workers in 35 countries in Europe and Central Asia, as well as 200 individuals. Since its 2005 relaunch as ICRSE, it is registered as a nonprofit foundation  in Amsterdam, Netherlands.

History 
In the mid-1970s a highly politicised prostitutes' rights movement (later known as the sex workers' rights movement) emerged in Europe. Starting with the strike by French prostitutes in 1975, which led to the creation of the French Collective of Prostitutes and in turn inspired the formation of groups such as the English Collective of Prostitutes in England (1975), the New York Prostitutes Collective (1979) which later became USPROS, the Australian Prostitutes Collective (1981) which is now known as the Prostitutes Collective of Victoria (PCV), and the Italian Committee for Civil Rights of Prostitutes (1982). The Canadian Organisation for the Rights of Prostitutes (CORP), the Dutch Red Thread and HYDRA in Germany also assumed significant roles in the movement. The International Committee for Prostitutes Rights was formed in 1985.

The ICPR adopted the World Charter for Prostitutes' Rights in 1985 in response to feminist arguments that all prostitution is forced prostitution. The Charter calls for the decriminalisation of "all aspects of adult prostitution resulting from individual decision". The Charter also states that prostitutes should be guaranteed "all human rights and civil liberties, including the freedom of speech, travel, immigration, work, marriage, and motherhood and the right to unemployment insurance, health insurance and housing". The Charter established a human rights-based approach, which has subsequently been further elaborated by the sex workers' rights movement.

The ICPR was relaunched as the International Committee for the Rights of Sex Workers in Europe (ICRSE) in Amsterdam in 2005, and drew up another charter of rights for sex workers, with a focus on European countries.

See also 
A Vindication of the Rights of Whores
COYOTE
International Day to End Violence Against Sex Workers
Margo St. James
Sex worker rights
Sex worker

References

Bibliography

External links 
 
 International Committee on the Rights of Sex Workers in Europe (ICRSE) – Global Network of Sex Work Projects

International professional associations
Sex worker organizations
Sex workers' rights